{{DISPLAYTITLE:Alpha2 Canum Venaticorum variable}}
An Alpha2 Canum Venaticorum variable (or α2 CVn variable) is a type of variable star.  These stars are chemically peculiar main sequence stars of spectral class B8p to A7p.  They have strong magnetic fields and strong silicon, strontium, or chromium spectral lines.  Their brightness typically varies by 0.01 to 0.1 magnitudes over the course of 0.5 to 160 days.

In addition to their intensities, the intensities and profiles of the spectral lines of α2 CVn variables also vary, as do their magnetic fields.  The periods of these variations are all equal and are believed to equal the period of rotation of the star.  It is thought that they are caused by an inhomogeneous distribution of metals in the atmospheres of these stars, so that the surface of the star varies in brightness from point to point.

The type-star which this class is named after is α² Canum Venaticorum, a star in the binary system of Cor Caroli, which is in the northern constellation of Canes Venatici.  Its brightness fluctuates by 0.14 magnitudes with a period of 5.47 days.

Examples

References